The doji (jp:どうじ 同事, same matter) is a commonly found pattern in a candlestick chart of financially traded assets (stocks, bonds, futures, etc.) in technical analysis. It is characterized by being small in length—meaning a small trading range—with an opening and closing price that are virtually equal. The efficacy of technical analysis is disputed by the efficient-market hypothesis, which states that stock market prices are essentially unpredictable.

The doji represents indecision in the market. A doji is not as significant if the market is not clearly trending, as non-trending markets are inherently indicative of indecision. If the doji forms in an uptrend or downtrend, this is normally seen as significant, as it is a signal that the buyers are losing conviction when formed in an uptrend and a signal that sellers are losing conviction if seen in a downtrend.

Types of Doji

A doji is a key trend reversal indicator. This is particularly true when there is a high trading volume following an extended move in either direction.  When a market has been in an uptrend and trades to a higher high than the previous three trading days, fails to hold that high, and closes in the lower 10% of that day's trading range, there is a high probability of a downtrend in the ensuing days.  Likewise, when the market has been in a downtrend and trades to a new low that's lower than the three previous trading days, fails to hold that low, and closes in the upper 10% of that day's trading range, there is a high probability of an uptrend in the ensuing days.

4-Price Doji is a horizontal line indicating that high, low, open and close were equal.

Uses of the Doji indicator 
A Doji indicator is mostly used in patterns, and it is actually a neutral pattern itself. Thus, when used alone, it doesn’t provide reliable signals. By itself, the Doji candlestick only shows that investors are in doubt. However, there are main patterns that can be easily found on the chart.

Specifically, there are two patterns purportedly providing trend confirmation:

 The morning Doji star is a three-candlestick pattern that works in a strong downtrend. If, after a long bearish candle, there is a gap down and a formation of the Doji candlestick, it’s a signal of possible reversal up. In order to confirm this, the third candle should be bullish and open with a gap up covering the previous gap down.
 The evening Doji star is the opposite of the morning Doji star. So, it works in a strong uptrend. A big bullish candle should be followed by a Doji one with a gap up. The trend reversal is confirmed if the third candle is bearish and opens with a gap down that covers the previous gap up.

See also 
 Candlestick chart
 Marubozu

References 

Candlestick patterns